Calligrapha philadelphica, known generally as the dogwood calligrapha or dogwood leaf beetle, is a species of leaf beetle in the family Chrysomelidae. It is found in North America.

References

Further reading

External links

 

Chrysomelinae
Articles created by Qbugbot
Beetles described in 1758
Taxa named by Carl Linnaeus